The Union for the Defense of the Motherland and Freedom was a military anti-Bolshevik organization. Created by Boris Savinkov in March 1918 with the sanction of the command of the Volunteer Army in the person of Generals Lavr Kornilov and Mikhail Alekseev.

In July 1918, organized the Yaroslavl, Rybinsk and Murom revolts. Uprising in Moscow and Kazan was also preparing, but the arrests of some members of the union in May 1918 thwarted them. After the suppression of the uprisings, the organization actually broke up. It had branches in Moscow, Rybinsk, Yaroslavl, Murom, Kazan and other cities.

In January 1921, it was reinstated at a meeting of Russian emigrants in Warsaw under the name People's Union for the Defense of the Motherland and Freedom. During 1921–23, the organization made attempts to fight and subversive against the Bolshevik regime: volunteers from the People's Union were sent to the Soviet Union to organize military units and underground groups in order to counter Bolshevik power, recruit supporters and conduct attempts to raise a popular uprising to overthrow Bolshevism. Every tenth day, the Information Bureau of the People's Union for the Defense of the Motherland and Freedom published multi-page (at least 6–8 sheets) "Bulletins of the Information Bureau of the People's Union for the Defense of the Motherland and Freedom"; at least 22 issues published; the last known, No. 22, was published on November 17, 1922.

In early 1924, the main contingent of the People's Union, operating on the territory of the Soviet Union, was destroyed by OGPU during Operation Syndicate–2. The leader of the People's Union for the Defense of the Motherland and Freedom, Boris Savinkov, died in the prison of the Joint State Political Directorate in the same year.

Structure
The headquarters of the organization had the following structure:
Boris Savinkov led the organization and, on its behalf, negotiated with representatives of the Entente;
Phlegont Klepikov was his secretary and at the same time treasurer;
Colonel Perkhurov was the chief of staff;
Colonel Gopper was the chief of military personnel;
Colonel Stradetsky was responsible for communications with the Volunteer Army on all fronts;
Lieutenant Colonel Friedrich Briedis was responsible for intelligence, counterintelligence and anti-Bolshevik propaganda in the Latvian rifle units;
Doctor Nikolai Grigoriev was the head of the provincial department and propaganda.
The cavalry center of the organization was headed by the captain of the Sumy Hussar Regiment Alexander Vilenkin, the artillery center – the Life Guards of the 3rd Artillery Brigade, Captain Schroeder. Alexander Dikgof-Derenthal helped maintain contacts with foreign missions. Lyubov Dikhof was the secretary of Boris Savinkov.

References

Sources
Bulletins of the Information Office of the People's Union for the Defense of the Homeland and Freedom
Boris Savinkov. The Fight Against the Bolsheviks // Russian Foreign Literature. Anthology in Six Volumes – Moscow: Book, 1990 – Volume 1 – Book 2. 1920–1925
The Union for the Defense of the Homeland and Freedom and the Yaroslavl Rebellion of 1918 // Proletarian Revolution, 1923 – No. 10
Korovin V.V., Rusanov E.P. Boris Savinkov's Сase // History of the Soviet Union, 1967 – No. 6 – Pages 143–155
David Golinkov. The Collapse of the Enemy Underground – Moscow, 1971 – Pages 99–108, 266–274, 357–364

Anti-Bolshevik uprisings
Anti-communist organizations in Russia